Palisadia is a genus of parasitic sea snails, marine gastropod mollusks in the family Eulimidae.

Distribution
This marine genus occurs in the Red Sea and off Christmas Island.

Species
 † Palisadia dockeryi Lozouet, 1999 
 Palisadia rittneri Mienis, 2017
 Palisadia subulata Laseron, 1956

References

 Laseron, C. 1956. The families Rissoinidae and Rissoidae (Mollusca) from the Solanderian and Damperian zoogeographical provinces. Australian Journal of Marine and Freshwater Research 7(3): 384-484

External links
  Ponder W. F. (1985) A review of the genera of the Rissoidae (Mollusca: Mesogastropoda: Rissoacea). Records of the Australian Museum supplement 4: 1-221

External links
 To World Register of Marine Species

Eulimidae